"Your Feet's Too Big" is a song composed in 1936 by Fred Fisher with lyrics by Ada Benson.  It has been recorded by many artists, notably the Ink Spots and by Fats Waller in 1939.  The song became associated with Waller who ad-libbed his own lyrics such as "Your pedal extremities are colossal, to me you look just like a fossil" and his catchphrase, "You know, your pedal extremities really are obnoxious. One never knows, do one?"  It was performed in the 1978 revue of Waller tunes, Ain't Misbehavin'.

The TV comedy series Harry and the Hendersons used Leon Redbone's version of the song as its theme tune.

The film Be Kind Rewind used Fats Waller’s version of the song, although Mos Def recorded his own rendition of the song as recorded by Waller for the film.

Notable recordings

 Kenny Ball
 The Beatles (officially unreleased)
 Kevin Bowyer
 Chubby Checker
 J. Lawrence Cook (piano roll)
 Freddy Gardner
 Steve Gillette
 The Hot Sardines
 The Ink Spots
 Alastair McDonald
 George Melly
 Ken Page
 Leon Redbone
 Ruben Studdard
 Aki Takase
 Fats Waller
 Michael-Leon Wooley
 The Captain Matchbox Whoopee Band
 Mos Def

References

1936 songs
Songs written by Fred Fisher
1930s jazz standards